Gregory Wayne Sheppard (born April 23, 1949) is a Canadian former professional ice hockey forward who most notably played for the Boston Bruins of the National Hockey League. He played in three Stanley Cup Finals with the Bruins (1974, 1977, 1978).

Career
Sheppard was born in North Battleford, Saskatchewan. Playing in the waning days of the period where teenagers were signed to junior league contracts by NHL teams, Sheppard played his junior hockey for the Estevan Bruins of the Western Hockey League, competing for the Memorial Cup in two seasons and being the star of his team's Memorial Cup drive in 1968.  In 1969 Sheppard began a three-year pro apprenticeship with the Oklahoma City Blazers of the Central Hockey League, becoming a Second Team All-Star in 1971.  The following season, he was named the league's most valuable player and remains the all-time leading career scorer of the franchise.

Joining the defending Stanley Cup champion Bruins in 1972 as a result of the parent club losing players to expansion and the new World Hockey Association, Sheppard – showing both scoring prowess and exemplary defensive and penalty killing skills – had a fine rookie season, finishing sixth in balloting for rookie of the year honors.  The following season Sheppard made his true mark in the playoffs, scoring eleven goals in sixteen playoff games as the Bruins went to the Cup finals.

He was a mainstay in Boston for six seasons in all, scoring thirty or more goals three straight years—and only a serious injury costing him much of the 1978 season cost him a fourth—as well as proving himself as one of the league's premier faceoff men and penalty killers.  He was named to play in the All-Star Game in 1976, during which he won the Bruins' Seventh Player Award as the team's unsung hero and the Elizabeth C. Dufresne Trophy for the player judged best in home games.  His best statistical season was 1975, in which he scored 78 points and finished with a plus/minus rating of +45.

Before the 1978–79 season began, Sheppard was dealt to the Pittsburgh Penguins in a three-way deal.  At first holding out due to dissatisfaction at the deal, he eventually joined the team in late November 1978, although his days as a scorer were behind him.  He played four seasons in all for Pittsburgh before retiring in 1982.

Sheppard played in 657 NHL games in all over ten seasons, finishing with 205 goals and 293 assists for 498 points.  A notably clean player for some rough teams, he finished with 243 penalty minutes.

Career statistics

External links
 

1949 births
Living people
Boston Braves (AHL) players
Boston Bruins players
Canadian ice hockey centres
Estevan Bruins players
Ice hockey people from Saskatchewan
Oklahoma City Blazers (1965–1977) players
Sportspeople from North Battleford
Pittsburgh Penguins players
Salt Lake Golden Eagles (WHL) players
Canadian expatriate ice hockey players in the United States